Ravinder Singh s/o Harchand Singh  is a Singaporean former major-general who served as Chief of Army between 2011 and 2014. He has been serving as the chief operating officer of ST Engineering since 2021.

Education
Singh received the Singapore Armed Forces Overseas Training Award (Academic) in 1983. He obtained a Bachelor of Arts (First Class Honours) and a Master of Arts in engineering science from the University of Oxford in 1986 and 1992 respectively. He was awarded the Singapore Armed Forces Postgraduate Scholarship in 1995. He graduated from the Massachusetts Institute of Technology in 1996 with a Master of Science in management. He attended the Advanced Management programme in Wharton Business School.

Military career
Singh enlisted in the Singapore Armed Forces (SAF) in December 1982. He was commissioned as a signals officer in December 1986 and served in active duty with the United Nations Iraq–Kuwait Observation Mission (UNIKOM) in Kuwait in 1991. In 1995, he attended the United States Army Command and General Staff College at Fort Leavenworth. Throughout his military career, he has held various other appointments, including: Head, System Development Group; Commander, 2nd Singapore Infantry Brigade; Commander, 6th Division. In 2009, he retired from active military service as Chief of Staff, Joint Staff and transited to a civil servant as Deputy Secretary (Technology), Ministry of Defence.

In 2011, Singh was recalled back to active service and succeeded Chan Chun Sing as the Chief of Army on 25 March 2011 and held this appointment until 21 March 2014, when he was succeeded by Perry Lim. Singh, who is of Punjabi Indian descent and a Sikh by religion, is the first non-Chinese Singaporean to serve as the Chief of Army since 1982.

Post-military career
Singh served as the president of ST Kinetics before his current appointment as the chief operating officer of ST Engineering, since 1 January 2021.

Personal life
Singh is married to Kohila and they have two sons.

Awards and decorations
  Public Administration Medal, (Gold) (Military) - PPA(E), in 2012.
  Public Administration Medal, (Silver) (Military) - PPA(P), in 2005.
  Long Service Medal (Military), in 2008.
  Singapore Armed Forces Long Service and Good Conduct (10 Years) Medal with 15 year clasp
  Singapore Armed Forces Good Service Medal
  Singapore Armed Forces Overseas Service Medal, in 1992
  United Nations Medal, in 1992.
  Knight Grand Cross of the Most Noble Order of the Crown
  Basic Parachutist Badge
  Combat Skills Badge
 Thailand Airborne Badge

References

Living people
Singaporean Sikhs
Singaporean people of Indian descent
Punjabi people
Chiefs of the Singapore Army
Alumni of the University of Oxford
MIT Sloan School of Management alumni
Non-U.S. alumni of the Command and General Staff College
Recipients of the Long Service Medal (Military) (Singapore)
1961 births